Rubery is a village in the Bromsgrove District and a suburb of Birmingham in the counties of Worcestershire and West Midlands, England.

Rubery was built on a sandstone quarry, now known as "Rubery Cutting"/"Leach Green Quarry", parts of which can still be seen near the Rubery 'Fly-over'. Former clay mining pits, later flooded and known locally as 'The Marl Holes', now make up Callowbrook Park, which, alongside St Chads Park, is one of the two main parks in the village.

Much of the urbanisation in Rubery occurred between 1960 and 1970, where suburbs replaced former farmland and historic farms such as Callowbrook Farm (formally located at the site of Callowbrook Bridge) and Gunner Lane Farm.

Etymology
The word "Rubery" comes from the old English word "" meaning "a rough hill", which may refer to Rubery Hill, situated on "Cоck-Hill Lane".

Geography and Demography
The village is divided between Birmingham and Bromsgrove. The boundary for both districts is between both Cock Hill Lane and Callowbrook Lane.

The village is also contiguous with nearby Frankley, Northfield and Rednal which are all part of Birmingham.

The village lies next to both the A38 road and M5 motorway. The village has good connections to nearby Birmingham, Bromsgrove, Redditch, Stourbridge, Worcester and Kidderminster. 

The population of Rubery was recorded at 11,016 for the Rubery and Rednal Ward of Birmingham. While the Bromsgrove wards of Rubery North and South had populations of both 3,643 (North) and 2,964 (South).

This means the population of the village overall is around 17,623. The ethnicity of the village when combined was recorded at 15,361 white residents and 2,262 non-white residents. The religious makeup of the village was 10,486 residents followed Christianity while 4,696 were of no religion and the remaining 2,441 were of Islam or other religions.

Literary connections
The author Jonathan Coe (b.1961) was brought up in Rubery, and his novel "The Terrible Privacy of Maxwell Sim" names several local places and landmarks.

Politics
The local councillors are, as of March 2014:

Peter McDonald (Labour) and Colin Wilson (Labour) - Waseley (District), 

Christine McDonald (Labour) - Beacon (District), 

and Peter McDonald (Labour) - Beacon (County)..

Part of Rubery is represented on Birmingham City Council by Adrian Delaney of the (Conservative Party (United Kingdom)) who is councillor for the Rubery and Rednal ward.

Geographically, most of Rubery lies in the Beacon Ward of Worcestershire County Council, and under both the Waseley and Beacon areas for Bromsgrove District Council. Part of Rubery falls under Birmingham Council.

Amenities
Rubery now has a village venue for event hire, called Father’s Barn with café and gift shop

Rubery High Street (New Road) boasts a number of shops, notably many charity and barber shops. There is also a number of food outlets including Subway, Greggs,] and various other takeaways and cafés.

In recent years Rubery has benefited from Great Park development, built of the former site of Rubery Asylum, and provides numerous leisure activities, namely an Empire Cinema, Hollywood Bowl, Gala Bingo, Nuffield Health (formerly Greens Health and Fitness), Frankie & Benny's, Chiquitos, Brewers Fayre, The Cake Solution and a Premier Inn. As well as further housing there is also a Morrisons which was formally a Safeway Megastore.

Primary Schools serving the area include (within Rubery) Beaconside Primary and Holywell Nursary and Primary School. Much of the village falls under the catchment area of Waseley Hills High School, which sits at the base of the Waseley Hills.

Compass

References

Villages in Worcestershire
Bromsgrove
Areas of Birmingham, West Midlands
Unparished areas in Worcestershire